Ashgabat Theme Park (Ertekiler Dünýäsi) is a theme park designed by Turkmen architects as a Turkmen version of Disneyland. It opened in Ashgabat, Turkmenistan, in 2006.

The $50 million recreation complex, based on Turkmen folk art and fairy tales, occupies  and consists of 80 attractions. It begins with a map of Turkmenistan and its environs that displays miniature copies of architectural monuments of the predominantly Muslim state. The Ferris Wheel follows designs of Turkmen jewelry, the Magic Carpet copies acclaimed Turkmen rugs, and a roller coaster zigzags over a mini-replica of the Caspian Sea, the source of the country's immense oil and gas reserves. Visitors are greeted by characters of Turkmen folklore, some of which resemble Western magic creatures. Khudoiberdy repels an attack of evil spirits, and obese Bovendjik swallows everyone he sees.

References

External links

Ashgabat Photo Gallery.
Ashgabat Neutrality Arch

Turkmenistan culture
Amusement parks in Turkmenistan
2006 establishments in Turkmenistan